Jack is a 2014 German drama film directed by Edward Berger. The film had its premiere in the competition section of the 64th Berlin International Film Festival. It was one of eight films shortlisted by Germany to be their submission for the Academy Award for Best Foreign Language Film at the 88th Academy Awards, but it lost out to Labyrinth of Lies.

Cast
 Ivo Pietzcker as Jack
 Georg Arms as Manuel
 Luise Heyer as Sanna
 Nele Mueller-Stöfen as Becki
 Vincent Redetzki as Jonas
 Jacob Matschenz as Philipp
 Odine Johne as Kati
 Johann Jürgens as Mattes
 Atheer Adel as Ophir
 Anthony Arnold as Danilo
 Amar Saaifan as Marc
 Justine Ewerth as Tanja

References

External links
 

2014 films
2010s coming-of-age drama films
2010s German-language films
German coming-of-age drama films
2014 drama films
2010s German films